Martha of Denmark (1277 – 2 March or 3 October 1341) was Queen of Sweden by marriage to King Birger. She was given the name Margaret ( at birth, but in Sweden was called Martha, and has been known in history by that name. She was regarded as a politically influential queen and an important figure in the Håtuna games and the Nyköping Banquet.

Life

Early life
Martha was born to King Eric V of Denmark and Agnes of Brandenburg and sister of King Eric VI. 
In 1282, peaceful relations were resumed between the kings of Denmark and Sweden, and it was agreed that Princess Martha should be married to Prince Birger, the heir to the Swedish throne. In 1284, the necessary papal dispensation for marriage between relations was obtained from the Pope. 
In 1288 in Helsinborg, furthermore, the dynastic marriage alliance between Denmark and Sweden was cemented by a marriage agreement between her brother King Eric VI of Denmark and her future sister-in-law Ingeborg Magnusdotter of Sweden; that marriage was celebrated in 1296.

According to the Erikskrönikan, Martha left Denmark already after her engagement was declared, and spent the rest of her childhood raised at the Swedish royal court until her wedding. It is not known exactly when she left Denmark, but it is considered likely that she did so prior to the death of her father in 1286.

Queen
The wedding between Martha and Birger was celebrated in Stockholm 25 November 1298. The wedding celebrations are described as very elaborate, with a procession of knights, amateur theater by nobles and the king naming his brothers dukes. She was praised when she asked for no dower other than the freedom of Magnus Algotsson, a noble arrested for involvement in an abduction of a bride in 1288. Regardless, she was given a dower land consisting of Fjädrundaland (Western Uppland) and Enköping as her personal fief, which was granted to her in 1300. She was crowned Queen of Sweden in Söderköping 2 December 1302.

Märta and Birger grew up together; their marriage is described as a happy one, and she is credited with a large influence over him and the affairs of state and is described as politically active. In 1304, Queen Martha as well as her sister-in-law Queen Ingeborg attended the border meeting between King Birger and her brother King Eric at Knäred or Fagerdala. At this occasion, her eldest son Magnus was proclaimed heir to the throne.

On 29 September 1306, Martha and Birger were invited to festivities and then captured by the king's brothers Duke Eric and Duke Valdemar during the Håtuna games and held captive at the Nyköping Castle, while the dukes took power. Two of her sons and a daughter was imprisoned with them, while her eldest son and the declared son and heir managed to escape to Denmark. In the treaty between her brother the King of Denmark and the dukes the following year, her brothers-in-law guaranteed her possession of her dower, and in 1308, Martha and Birger were released.

Queen Martha reportedly played a significant part in the famous Nyköping Banquet in 1317, where the king and queen retaliated against the dukes and had the king's brothers invited to festivities, after which they were imprisoned and died in the dungeons; she is in fact pointed out as the creator of the plot. According to Erikskrönikan, Queen Martha and the king's official Johan Brunkow initiated the arrest of the dukes, while the chronicle of Lübeck claims that she influenced Birger supported by her brother the King of Denmark. Erikskrönikan describes how the queen received her brothers-in-law with assurances that she loved them as if they were her brothers by blood. The chronicle mentions her participating in the festivities: "Everyone danced all the way from indoors to outdoors; the queen had never looked so happy before". Her good mood was seen as a cruel sign of excitement that she and her spouse were to have their revenge for the Håtuna games, as she was aware of the plan to capture the dukes in the middle of the festivities. 
 
The murder of the dukes, however, led to a conflict with the forces of the widows of the two dukes, who defeated the king's forces in 1318, leading the king and queen to flee to Gotland and from there to Zealand in Denmark with their children, while the son of one of the dukes was proclaimed king of Sweden.

Exile
On 4 September 1318, King Eric of Denmark granted Martha the manor Hjarup on Jylland for her income. The following year, her brother Eric died and was succeeded by her younger brother Christopher II of Denmark, with whom she was reportedly not on as good terms as with her elder brother, possibly because Christopher had earlier sided with Birger's brothers against Eric. Christopher II granted Martha and Birger the manor Spegerborg at Skälskör on Själland with two parishes.

Martha was widowed in 1321. Evidently, Martha was forced to accompany King Christopher when he was exiled to Germany in 1326, and was not able to return for three years. In 1329, she was guaranteed the return of her property. In 1332, Christopher II died and Denmark was disrupted by interregnum. Nothing is known of her during these years, but at some point during her later years, she retired to St. Peders Kloster in Naestved in Själland.

Her second son died in exile in 1319. In 1320, her eldest son Magnus returned to Sweden, where he was executed. The chronicles therefore almost only mention the two daughters of the royal couple, Agnes and Catherine. Nothing is known of her youngest daughter Catherine, and the only thing known of her eldest daughter Agnes was that the King of Denmark donated lands to Slangerup Abbey for her upkeep in 1344.

She was buried in St. Bendt's Church in Ringsted.

Issue
 Magnus (1300–1320), executed in Sweden
 Eric (d. 1319), Archdeacon at Uppsala, died in exile
 Agnes (d. after 1344), a nun at Slangerup Abbey
 Catherine (d. after 1320)

Notes

References
 
 
 
 
 

|-

House of Estridsen
Margaret 1298
Burials at St. Bendt's Church, Ringsted
1277 births
1341 deaths
13th-century Danish people
14th-century Danish people
13th-century Danish women
14th-century Danish women
13th-century Swedish women
14th-century Swedish women
13th-century Swedish people
14th-century Swedish people
Daughters of kings